The SS Benjamin Noble was a lake freighter that operated on the Great Lakes. She was built as a "canaller," a vessel designed for use in what were then the dimensions of the Welland Canal, but was converted by her owners for services in the open Great Lakes. Heavily laden and top-heavy with a cargo of railroad rails, she sank in a Lake Superior storm near Knife River, Minnesota, in April 1914 with the loss of all hands.

After more than 90 years as a ghost ship, the hulk of the Benjamin Noble was rediscovered in the autumn of 2004. The wreck was placed on the National Register of Historic Places in 2007 as NRHP site #07000984.

Design
The Benjamin Noble was unique among Lake freighters because her stern cabins were elevated on a poop deck. Her bow cabins were also elevated on a forecastle deck. This also meant that she sat quite low in the water meaning that her spar deck often got wet.  Maritime historian Dwight Boyer attributes the 1914 loss of the vessel to a combination of deliberate cargo overloading and the ship's unusual design.  On her last voyage the low-riding vessel had very little freeboard and was vulnerable to swamping.

Damaged 1912
On October 14, 1912 the "Benjamin Noble" near Detour struck and leaked; arrived October 20 Superior with 54 plates damaged (repaired)

Wreck
The Duluth-bound Benjamin Noble entered Lake Superior on 25 April 1914 under command of Captain John Eisenhardt from Milwaukee, WI; the Noble was his first command. Also bound for Duluth was the lumber steamer Norwalk, which trailed the Noble and eventually passed her on the 27th. That night, however, a fierce spring gale hit the lake. The Noble was apparently following the Norwalk until around 3am when both ships were near Knife Island. At that time a passing freighter, the Daniel J. Morrell, noticed the lights of one of the ships suddenly disappear.

Had she been able to make anchor in the sheltered port of Duluth, the Benjamin Noble would have been saved.  However, at a key moment in the storm, entry to the harbor was unnavigable after the obsolescent south pier torch light blew out. Harbor laborer Stan Standen tried to reach the light to relight it, but was blown into the canal and lost.

The Norwalk struggled into Duluth harbor at 4:30am on 28 April. That afternoon the hatch covers of the Noble were found washed up on the beach near Duluth. The next day more wreckage, including her pilot house, was found. On  April 29, 1914 it was reported several crewmembers' remains were found on a sand reef near Minnesota Reef; this report was incorrect In August 1915 a ships cook reported seeing a ships long spar (possibly from the "Benjamin Noble") in Lake Superior 8 miles from Duluth on the North Shore near Knife River.

Victims
This being the first trip of the season, the captain had not given a crew list. Of the estimated 16  to 18
to 20 crew members, the names of 13 are known with certitude, and an additional two names are known with probability.

Discovery
In the Autumn of 2004 a shipwreck research team consisting of Jerry Eliason, Kraig Smith, Ken Merryman and Randy Beebe were searching for the Robert Wallace when their side scan sonar picked up the outlines of a shipwreck. Randy Beebe described the event:
It was the last pass of the day, which was going to be the last day of the search season. We were just going to pull up the side-scan sonar and head in, and we noticed a target on the screen. So right away we headed over there and investigated it more with the side-scan sonar, and sure enough we had a shipwreck.
The team was expecting to see the Wallace, but the ship they found was made of steel. They were able to lower a camera into the cargo hold of the mystery ship. They saw the holds of railroad rails, thus confirming that the wreck was that of the long lost Benjamin Noble.

Wreck condition

The Benjamin Noble was extensively damaged by the sinking. The ship lies upright in a trench made when it hit the lake bottom; the bow end is covered in silt. The aft half of the ship is buried almost up to the level of the main deck, with the hull split just forward of the boiler room. The rear cabins are collapsed due to the weight of water as the ship plunged quickly. The cargo hatches are gone, exposing the cargo of railroad rails. The rear mast has fallen, and scattered nearby are the ventilators and a lifeboat.

See also
List of shipwrecks in the Great Lakes
National Register of Historic Places listings in Lake County, Minnesota

References

1909 ships
Great Lakes freighters
Steamships of the United States
Maritime incidents in April 1914
National Register of Historic Places in Lake County, Minnesota
Ships lost with all hands
Shipwrecks of Lake Superior
Shipwrecks on the National Register of Historic Places in Minnesota
Shipwrecks of the Minnesota coast
Ships built in Wyandotte, Michigan
Shipwreck discoveries by Jerry Eliason, Ken Merryman and Kraig Smith